Hans Croon (25 May 1936 – 5 February 1985) was a Dutch football manager who won the 1976 UEFA Cup Winners' Cup Final with Anderlecht.

Managerial career
As well as Anderlecht, Croon coached in the Netherlands and Belgium with DWS, VER, HVC, FC Volendam, K.S.V. Waregem, Lierse S.K. and NEC.

His Anderlecht side won the 1976 UEFA Cup Winners' Cup with a 4–2 victory over West Ham United on 5 May 1976 at Heysel Stadium in Brussels. He also won the Belgian Cup in 1976 with Anderlecht. He left Belgium and moved to NEC, and coached the team until 1978. He later succeeded compatriot Kees Rijvers at Beringen, with whom he suffered relegation from the Eerste Klasse.

In 1995, it was reported that Croon was persuading players to take drugs during his short tenure at FC VVV. Then VVV player Mikan Jovanovic confirmed the report, stating he was one of three players to take performance-enhancing pills.

Personal life
After retiring from the football world, the spiritual Croon joined the Bhagwan movement and named himself Shunyam Avyakul.

Death
He died in February 1985 in a Rotterdam hospital at the age of 48 following a car crash near Arnemuiden a week earlier.

Honours

Manager

SV Waregem  

 Belgian Cup: 1972-73

 RSC Anderlecht 

 Belgian Cup: 1975-76
 European Cup Winners' Cup: 1975–76 (winners)

References

1936 births
1985 deaths
Sportspeople from Malang
Dutch football managers
AFC DWS managers
SV SVV managers
FC Volendam managers
K.S.V. Waregem managers
Lierse S.K. managers
R.S.C. Anderlecht managers
NEC Nijmegen managers
VVV-Venlo managers
K. Beringen F.C. managers
Road incident deaths in the Netherlands
Dutch expatriate football managers
Expatriate football managers in Belgium
Dutch expatriate sportspeople in Belgium
Rajneesh movement